A child is a young person who is not yet an adult.

The term Child may also refer to:

In computer science
 A child object is derived through any generalization from a parent object in Unified Modeling Language
 The child node of a tree
 The child process created by another process

In medicine and healthcare
 CHILD syndrome (congenital hemidysplasia with ichthyosiform erythroderma and limb defects), a genetic syndrome
 Children's Healthcare is a Legal Duty (CHILD), an American lobby group that opposes religious exemption laws

Music

Artists
 Child (band), a popular British pop act of the late 1970s
 Lupe Fiasco, "The Child" of the hip hop supergroup Child Rebel Soldier

Songs
 "Child" (song), by Mark Owen
 "Child" (Mark song)
 "Child", by Arca from Arca
 "Child", by Design from One Sunny Day: Singles and Rarities 1968-1978
 "Child", by Freddie Aguilar, an English version of "Anak"
 "Child", by Nidji from Breakthru'

Other uses
 Child (surname)
 Child archetype, a Jungian psychology archetype
 Child baronets, four titles, two in the Baronetage of England and two in the Baronetage of the United Kingdom
 Child (magazine), an American parenting magazine published from 1986 to 2007
 Child & Co., a formerly independent private bank now owned by The Royal Bank of Scotland
 Child (hieroglyph), an ancient Egyptian hieroglyph
 Childs Hill, Greater London, named after Richard le Child
Kids (film), a 1995 American coming-of-age drama exploitation film directed by Larry Clark and written by Harmony Korine

See also
 Chiiild, Canadian band
 The Child (disambiguation)
 Child Ballads, a collection of traditional folk tunes
 Children (disambiguation)
 Childs (disambiguation)
 Childe
 L'Enfant (disambiguation) (French for "the child")